Ferndale is a census-designated place (CDP) in Anne Arundel County, Maryland, United States. At the 2010 census, the population was 16,746.

Geography
The Ferndale CDP is bounded by Interstate 695 (the Baltimore Beltway) and Cabin Branch (a stream) to the north, by Maryland Route 162 (Aviation Boulevard) to the west, by Maryland Route 176 (Dorsey Road) and 8th Avenue to the south, and by Maryland Route 2 (Governor Ritchie Highway) to the east. Neighboring communities are Linthicum to the northwest, Brooklyn Park to the northeast, and Glen Burnie to the east and south. Baltimore–Washington International Thurgood Marshall Airport is to the west across Aviation Boulevard.

Climate
The climate in this area is characterized by hot, humid summers and generally mild to cool winters.  According to the Köppen Climate Classification system, Ferndale has a humid subtropical climate, abbreviated "Cfa" on climate maps.

Demographics

At the 2000 census, there were 16,056 people, 6,240 households and 4,286 families living in the CDP. The racial makeup was 77.20% White, 15.60% African American, 0.40% Native American, 3.29% Asian, 0.02% Pacific Islander, 1.47% from other races, and 2.02% from two or more races. Hispanic or Latino of any race were 3.11% of the population.

There were 6,240 households, of which 32.7% had children under the age of 18 living with them, 48.3% were married couples living together, 15.1% had a female householder with no husband present, and 31.3% were non-families. 24.1% of all households were made up of individuals, and 9.1% had someone living alone who was 65 years of age or older. The average household size was 2.57 and the average family size was 3.05.

25.5% of the population were under the age of 18, 8.2% from 18 to 24, 33.5% from 25 to 44, 20.5% from 45 to 64, and 12.4% who were 65 years of age or older. The median age was 35 years. For every 100 females, there were 95.0 males. For every 100 females age 18 and over, there were 90.7 males.

The median household income was $45,816 and the median family income was $51,289. Males had a median income of $38,068 and females $28,892. The per capita income was $20,806. About 4.4% of families and 7.8% of the population were below the poverty line, including 8.9% of those under age 18 and 6.7% of those age 65 or over.

References

Census-designated places in Maryland
Census-designated places in Anne Arundel County, Maryland